Worawut Chansitha (born July 23, 2000), is a Thai professional footballer who plays as a midfielder for Thai League 1 club Trat.

References

External links

2000 births
Living people
Worawut Chansitha
Association football midfielders
Worawut Chansitha
Worawut Chansitha